Kameh Olya (also Romanized as Kāmeh ‘Olyā; also known as Kāmeh-ye Bālā) is a village in Bala Velayat Rural District, in the Central District of Torbat-e Heydarieh County, Razavi Khorasan Province, Iran. At the 2006 census, its population was 507, in 143 families.

References 

Populated places in Torbat-e Heydarieh County